"Werewolves of London" is a rock song performed by American singer-songwriter Warren Zevon. It was composed by Zevon, LeRoy Marinell and Waddy Wachtel and was included on Excitable Boy (1978), Zevon's third solo album. The track featured Fleetwood Mac's Mick Fleetwood and John McVie on drums and bass respectively. The single was released by Asylum Records and was a top 40 US hit, the only one of Zevon's career, reaching No. 21 on the Billboard Hot 100 that May.

Background and recording
The song began as a joke by Phil Everly (of The Everly Brothers) to Zevon in 1975, over two years before the recording sessions for Excitable Boy. Everly had watched a television broadcast of the 1935 film Werewolf of London and "suggested to Zevon that he adapt the title for a song and dance craze." Zevon, Marinell and Wachtel played with the idea and wrote the song in about 15 minutes, all contributing lyrics that were transcribed by Zevon's then-wife Crystal. However, none of them took the song seriously.

Soon after, Zevon's friend Jackson Browne saw the lyrics and thought "Werewolves of London" had potential and began performing the song during his own live concerts. T Bone Burnett also performed the song, on the first leg of Bob Dylan's Rolling Thunder Revue tour in the autumn of 1975. Burnett's version of the song included alternate or partially improvised lyrics mentioning stars from classical Hollywood cinema, along with mentions of vanished labor leader Jimmy Hoffa, and adult film stars Marilyn Chambers and Linda Lovelace. "Excitable Boy" and "Werewolves of London" were considered for but not included on Zevon's self-titled second album in 1976.

According to Wachtel, "Werewolves of London" was "the hardest song to get down in the studio I've ever worked on." However, Wachtel "laid down his solo in one take." They tried at least seven different configurations of musicians in the recording studio before being satisfied with McVie and Fleetwood's contributions. The protracted studio time and musicians' fees led to the song eating up most of the album's budget.

The song's lyrics "He was looking for the place called Lee Ho Fook's / Gonna get a big dish of beef chow mein" refer to Lee Ho Fook, a Chinese restaurant on 15 Gerrard Street in London's Chinatown, which is in the West End of London. Egon Ronay's Dunlop Guide for 1974 discussed the restaurant and said it served Cantonese cuisine. In concerts, Zevon would often change the line "You better stay away from him, he'll rip your lungs out, Jim / I'd like to meet his tailor", to "And he's looking for James Taylor".

Over Zevon's objections, Elektra Records chose "Werewolves of London" as the album's first single (he preferred "Johnny Strikes Up the Band" or "Tenderness on the Block"). The song was a quick hit, staying in the Billboard Top 40 chart for over a month.

Personnel
Warren Zevon – piano, vocals
Mick Fleetwood – drums
John McVie – electric bass
Waddy Wachtel – guitar

Reception and legacy
BBC Radio 2 listeners rated it as having the best opening line in a song.

Zevon later said of the song, "I don't know why that became such a hit. We didn't think it was suitable to be played on the radio. It didn't become an albatross. It's better that I bring something to mind than nothing. There are times when I prefer that it was "Bridge Over Troubled Water", but I don't think bad about the song. I still think it's funny." He also described "Werewolves of London" as a novelty song, "[but] not a novelty the way, say, Steve Martin's "King Tut" is a novelty."

The song had a resurgence in popularity in 1986 due to its use in a scene in The Color of Money, where Tom Cruise dances and lip-syncs to the song in a scene in which Cruise "displayed the depths of his talents at the billiards game of 9-ball."

After Zevon's death in 2003, Jackson Browne stated that he interpreted the song as describing an upper-class English womanizer: "It's about a really well-dressed, ladies' man, a werewolf preying on little old ladies. In a way it's the Victorian nightmare, the gigolo thing."

Chart history

Weekly charts

Year-end charts

Samples and other versions
 The Grateful Dead covered the song in a number of live concerts in 1978, one of which was released on Red Rocks: 7/8/78. The group resurrected the song for Halloween night concerts in 1985, 1990, and 1991.
 David Lindley and El Rayo-X released the song on the 1988 album Very Greasy.
 Adam Sandler provided a version for the tribute album, Enjoy Every Sandwich: The Songs of Warren Zevon (October 2004). Sandler also performed it on the Late Show on 15 December 2004.
 American pop-rocker Masha covered the song for a Three Olives Vodka ad campaign in 2014.
Dexy's Midnight Runners song "One of Those Things" has a riff taken from "Werewolves of London". For the 1997 re-release of the album Don't Stand Me Down, Kevin Rowland admitted in the liner notes that he had used the riff and consequently Zevon and his co-writers, LeRoy Marinell and Waddy Wachtel, were given writing credits on the song.
 Kid Rock sampled this song in 2008 (and Lynyrd Skynyrd's "Sweet Home Alabama", which has a similar riff) on "All Summer Long" and credits Zevon as a songwriter.
 In 2017, Italian comedy-rock band Elio e le Storie Tese made an Italian version of this song, Licantropo Vegano (Vegan Werewolf); the difference with the original version is that the werewolf is vegan and the song is based in Milan, and not in London.

References

1978 singles
1978 songs
Asylum Records singles
Black comedy music
Halloween songs
Songs about London
Songs about werewolves
Songs written by Warren Zevon
Warren Zevon songs